Krahô (Krahô: Mehĩ jarkwa ) is a dialect of the Canela-Krahô language, a Timbira variety of the Northern Jê language group (Jê, Macro-Jê) spoken in Tocantins, Brazil by the Krahô people.

Phonology

Vowels 

 A short /a/ can have an allophone of a mid-central sound [ə].

Consonants 

 /ʋ/ is realized as [w] when occurring in between vowels.

References

Jê languages
Languages of Brazil